The Israel Open (also known as the Electra Israel Open) is a professional tennis tournament played on outdoor hard courts. It is currently part of the ATP Challenger Tour. It has been held annually in Ra'anana, Israel since 2015. The tournament was previously held in Ramat HaSharon, from 2008 to 2010.

Past finals

Singles

Doubles

External links
ITF search 

ATP Challenger Tour
Tretorn SERIE+ tournaments
Hard court tennis tournaments
Tennis tournaments in Israel